Afghans in Iran are citizens of Afghanistan who are temporarily residing in Iran as refugees or asylum seekers. They form the largest percent of the Afghan diaspora. The first wave of Afghans were admitted to Iran after the start of the Soviet–Afghan War in 1979. 

According to Afghanistan's Ministry of Refugees and Repatriation and the United Nations High Commissioner for Refugees (UNHCR), there are approximately 3 million Afghan citizens in Iran as of January 2023, most of whom were born and raised in Iran during the last four decades. They are under the care and protection of the UNHCR, and are provided time-limited legal status by Iran's Bureau of Aliens and Foreign Immigrant Affairs, without a path to obtain permanent residency. There are also about 600,000 Afghan tourists, travelers, merchants, exchanged students, migrant workers, and others. According to Hassan Kazemi Qomi, half of Iran's foreign investors are Afghans. 

There have been widespread reports of Iranian mistreatment of Afghan migrants and their human rights, and the community is very marginalized. In 2006, about 146,387 undocumented Afghans were deported. Many more continue to experience such events. In 2010, six Afghan prisoners were executed by hanging in the streets of Iran, which sparked angry demonstrations in Afghanistan.

Political history and migration

As neighboring countries with cultural ties, there has been a long history of population movements between Iran and Afghanistan. Southern Afghanistan was contested between the Persian Safavid dynasty and the Moghuls of India until 1709 when Mir Wais Hotak, founder of the Hotaki dynasty, declared it independent. During the reign of Nader Shah, the brother of Ahmad Shah Durrani was made Governor of Mazandaran Province. A few years after Nader Shah's death, Durrani and his Afghan army made Nader's grandson Shahrokh Afshar, ruler of the small remaining Afshar territory comprising the Khorasan and Kohistan provinces of Iran, their vassal for some years. The region remained a vassal territory of the Afghan Empire until Durrani's death. During the early 19th century, the Persian army invaded Herat several times but with British assistance the Afghans quickly expelled them. Communities made up of 2,000 and 5,000 households of ethnic Hazaras were formed in Torbat-e Jam and Bakharz in Iran. The 1857 Treaty of Paris ended hostilities of the Anglo-Persian War. The modern day Afghan–Iranian border gradually began to take shape in the second half of the 19th century.

Afghan migrant workers, pilgrims and merchants, who settled in Iran over the years, had by the early 20th century, become large enough to be officially classified as their own ethnic group, referred to variously as Khavari or Barbari. Young Hazara men have embraced migrant work in Iran and other Persian Gulf states to save money for marriage and become independent; such work has even come to be seen as a "rite of passage". Such migration intensified in the early 1970s due to famine, and by 1978, there were an estimated several hundred thousand Afghan migrant workers in Iran.

The Soviet–Afghan War, which erupted in 1979, was the beginning of a series of major waves of refugee flight from Afghanistan. Those who came to Iran often augmented the ranks of migrant workers already there. The new Islamic Republic took place around the same time as the influx of masses of Afghan migrants to other countries, fleeing the plagues of problems in their own country. Iran started recognising those Afghans listed as migrants workers or refugees as legals. They issued them "blue cards" to denote their status, entitling them to free primary and secondary education, as well as subsidised healthcare and food. However, the government maintained some restrictions on their employment, namely prohibiting them from owning their own businesses or working as street vendors.

Most of the early academic attention on these new immigrants was focused on Afghan refugees in Pakistan. Studies on Afghans in Iran came later due to the political situation during the Iran–Iraq War. By 1992, a report by the United Nations High Commissioner for Refugees (UNHCR) estimated that there were around 2.8 million Afghans in Iran. Just 10% were housed in refugee camps; most settled in or near urban areas. For their efforts in housing and educating these refugees and illegals, the Iranian government received little financial aid from the international community. With the fall of the Najibullah government of Afghanistan in 1992, Iran began efforts to encourage refugees to repatriate. During these years, there were many reports of cases of Afghans being harassed by Iranian law enforcement officers. Legal residents had their identity cards confiscated and exchanged with temporary residency permits of one-month validity, at the expiry of which they were expected to have left Iran and have repatriated.

21st century
Since 2002 millions of Afghan citizens living in Iran and Pakistan have returned to Afghanistan. In 2012, around 173,000 of them were forcefully returned. Over 103,086 more were deported in 2013. Many of the deportees complained of torture and other abuses by Iranian authorities. In October 2020 there were 780,000 registered citizens of Afghanistan residing in Iran. Most of these were born and raised in Iran during the last four decades. In 2015, Abdolreza Rahmani Fazli stated that 2.5 million Afghans resided in Iran, which includes the registered and illegals as well as those who were admitted to the country with Afghan passports and Iranian visas. Over 600,000 Afghans living in Iran have returned to Afghanistan in 2022. Afghanistan's Ministry of Refugees and Repatriation has acknowledged that approximately 3 million Afghan citizens still remain in Iran as of January 2023.

Social and legal issues

Afghan refugees have come to Iran since the 1980s, including children and adolescents. Many were born in Iran over the last 30 years but were unable to gain citizenship due to Iranian immigration laws. The refugees include Hazaras, Tajiks, Qizilbash, Pashtuns, and other ethnic groups of Afghanistan. One UNHCR paper claims that nearly half the documented refugees are Hazara, a primarily Shi'a group.

In Afghanistan, some people feel that using birth control violates the tenets of their religion; however, in Iran, attitudes are far different, due to the country's extensive promotion of family planning. Afghans in Iran have moved closer to mainstream Iranian values in this regard; the Iranian influence has even filtered back into Afghanistan. One study in Khorasan has found that while overall fertility rates for Afghan migrant women are somewhat higher than those for Iranian women there—3.9 vs. 3.6—the similarity hides significant age-related differences in fertility, with older Afghan migrant women having a far higher number of children than older Iranian urban women, while younger Afghan migrant women's number of children appears to be approaching the far-lower Iranian urban norm. Contraceptive usage among the same study group was 55%, higher than for local Iranian women.

More broadly, the same conservative men who resisted aggressive attempts by communist governments in Afghanistan to expand women's education and their role in the economy are now faced with the very changes from which they had hoped to shield their families. This shift in family and gender roles was induced by the experience of living as refugees in largely Muslim society.

Some Afghan men married Iranian women during their residence in Iran; however, under Iranian nationality law, the children of such marriages are not recognized as Iranian citizens, and it is also more difficult for the men to gain Iranian citizenship than for Afghan women married to Iranian men. As of 2019 this law has changed and Iranian women in mixed marriages can transfer their Iranian nationality to their children, regardless of the nationality of the child's father.

Although Iranian authorities have made efforts to educate Afghan children, Human Rights Watch reports that many undocumented Afghan children face bureaucratic obstacles that prevent their children from attending school, in violation of international law. Iranian law limits Afghans who have permission as refugees to work to a limited number of dangerous and poorly paid manual labor jobs, regardless of their education and skills.

Marriage with indigenous people
According to statistics released in the year 1995, nearly 24,000 marriages of Iranian nationals have been recorded in Iran, and it is anticipated that nearly the same amount of legal marriage has been recorded. According to Article 1060 of the Civil Code of Iran, the marriage of Iranian women to foreign men with the permission of the government and any foreigner who, without the permission referred to above, will marry an Iranian woman, will be sentenced to one year's imprisonment of up to three years. And the government's important marriages are prohibited. Under Iranian law, Afghan women who marry men in Iran are considered citizens of Iran under Article 976 of the Civil Code and can take Iranian citizenship and their children enjoy the conditions of an Iranian citizen, but if Afghan men marry Iranian women to men Citizenship of Iran does not belong and according to Article 979 of the Civil Code they can only apply for citizenship. Children from foreign marriages with Iranian women up to 18 years of age are considered to be their fathers, and if their fathers lack a degree of residence, they will encounter limitations for people without a degree in Iran. These children can apply for citizenship at the age of 18 years. Although plans have been pursued in the Iranian parliament to grant Iranian citizenship to sons of Iranian mothers and fathers, these plans have always been stopped.

A new policy allowing Iranian women to pass down their citizenship to their children at birth started to effect from 2020. As of mid-November, about 75,000 people had applied for citizenship under the new law. The new policy particularly affects the children of Iranian women who have married Afghan men. While Iran's nationality laws predate the 1979 Islamic revolution, Mohsen Kazempour, a co-founder of the Datikan Legal Institute in Tehran, said the current bias against foreigners is in part rooted in a nationalist hysteria that followed the revolution and the eight-year war between Iran and Iraq. "Iran was at war with Iraq, and Iraq was supported by many foreign nations," he said. "So the Iranian government was very concerned about the penetration of secret agents in the government or army."

Torture, persecution and deprivation of rights

Iran is not a signatory to the United Nations Convention Against Torture. This makes Afghans vulnerable to torture in that country. Violence and racism against them has been steadily increasing in the last two decades. It was reported in May 2020 that up to 50 Afghan migrants who crossed into Iran illegally were beaten and thrown in a river, of which half did not survive, while in another incident Iranian forces shot at a vehicle carrying Afghans, resulting in three deaths. These incidents led to protests in Afghanistan. The Iranian government has also failed to take necessary steps to protect its Afghan population from physical violence linked to rising anti-refugee sentiment in Iran, or to hold those responsible accountable. 

According to recent statistics, a total of 5,399 foreign nationals were in Iranian prisons. Of this, 2,240 had been convicted of drug related offenses, 1,323 of theft and 989 of battery or assault. It was reported in 2010 that around 3,000 Afghan prisoners faced the death penalty in Iran. A number of them have been executed by hanging in the last decade. Iran imposes the death penalty even for minor drug-related offenses, such as possession of only 30 grams of amphetamines. Afghans nationals are completely prohibited in 15 provinces, and partially prohibited in the other 12 provinces. The Iranian government decided to restrict the presence of Afghan citizens in the provinces via provincial executive orders.

Economy

According to Hassan Kazemi Qomi, half of Iran's foreign investors are Afghans. With a population of 2 million, they have about 10% of the labor market in Iran. Their presence has led to protests by Iranian workers. The Iranian government has also imposed a number of restrictions, including the ban on the use of foreign workers in governmental and non-governmental organizations, and called on all government agencies, non-state actors, companies and contractors to provide their needed labor to Iranian workforce, with numerous penalties, including imprisonment and a fine for the offending employers. However, many employers prefer to hire Afghans due their low wage expectations, lack of insurance requirements, and their high productivity.

Demography

Ethnicity and religious sect 
By ethnicity, Afghans in Iran are Hazaras at 40%, Tajiks at 36%, and Pashtuns, Uzbeks and others at 24%. According to the deputy director of the General Directorate for Foreign Affairs, approximately 70% of foreign nationals living in Iran are Shia Muslims and 30% Sunni Muslims.

Gender composition 
Based on the 2016 Iranian census, 845,267 (53%) of the Afghan national population in Iran were men and 738,712 (47%) women.

Age 
Based on the 2016 census, about 46% were under 20 years old and about 67% were under the 30 years old.  Given the 40-year presence history, many of them were born in Iran. The Afghan refugee population were younger than the indigenous population of Iran (31% of Iranians were under the age 20, and 49% of Iranians were under the age of 30).  One of the main reason is the high birth rates and the low age of marriage in this population.

Distribution 
Residence of Afghan refugees is prohibited in 15 provinces of Iran, except in the other three provinces of Qom, Alborz, Tehran (except Khojir, district 13), in the rest of the provinces, they only have the right to reside in some cities.  Fatemeh Ashrafi, the reason for the restrictions on the movement of Afghan refugees in Iran, allowed the Iranian government, in accordance with the 1951 Convention, to protect refugees from limiting the displacement of foreign immigrants in their country based on national interests and security issues.  [11]

Health and education

According to Tehran Times, 120,000 Afghans in Iran have health insurance. Over 40,000 of them are enrolled in Iranian schools and universities. Their education in Iran is free.

Repatriation and deportation
Every year large number of Afghans return to Afghanistan from neighboring Iran and Pakistan. Some are deported for overstaying or getting in trouble with the law.

In popular culture
Since the 1980s, a number of Iranian movies set in Iran have featured Afghan immigrant characters. One early example is Mohsen Makhmalbaf's 1988 movie The Cyclist, in which the character of the title, a former cycling champion of Afghanistan, gives a demonstration in his town's square whereby he rides his bicycle without stopping for seven days and seven nights, with the aim of raising money for life-saving surgery for his wife. In the end, even after seven days, he continues to pedal endlessly, too fatigued to hear his son's pleas to get off his bicycle. One scholar analyses the film as an allegory which parallels the exploitation that Afghan refugees suffer from in Iran and from which they are unable to escape.

Other notable films with Afghan characters include Jafar Panahi's 1996 The White Balloon, Abbas Kiarostami's 1997 A Taste of Cherry, Majid Majidi's 2000 Baran, and Bahram Bayzai's 2001 Sagkoshi.

Notable people

 Jalaleddin Farsi, former candidate for the presidency of Iran
 Setayesh Qorayshi
 Fereshteh Hosseini

See also

 Afghanistan–Iran relations

References

Further reading

External links

 Photos: The Life of Afghan Refugees in Tehran
 Photo essay by Samad Ali Moradi of Afghans in Iran (1993–96)

 
Iran
Afghanistan–Iran relations